Fort James Corporation was an American pulp and paper company based in Deerfield, Illinois. Its products were sold under a variety of brand names, which included  Brawny, Mardi Gras, and Quilted Northern.

At the time of its acquisition, Fort James Corporation was the United States' largest manufacturer of commercial tissue.

History
In 1997, the Fort Howard Paper Company and the James River Corporation merged to form the Fort James Corporation. Fort Howard was headquartered in Green Bay, Wisconsin, and James River in Richmond, Virginia.

In 2000, the Fort James Corporation was acquired by Georgia-Pacific for $11 billion; GP is based in Atlanta, Georgia.

References

Companies based in Green Bay, Wisconsin
Manufacturing companies based in Wisconsin
Pulp and paper companies of the United States
Defunct pulp and paper companies
Manufacturing companies established in 1997
Manufacturing companies disestablished in 2000
Georgia-Pacific
1997 establishments in Wisconsin
2000 disestablishments in Wisconsin
2000 mergers and acquisitions